Sugungga is one of the five surviving stories of the Korean pansori storytelling tradition. The other stories are Simcheongga, Heungbuga, Jeokbyeokga, and Chunhyangga.

Sugungga is considered to be more exciting and farcical than the other pansoris because of its personification of animals. The satire is more frank and humorous. It has serious parts as well in the characters of the king and loyal retainers. Therefore Sugungga is regarded as the "small Jeokbyeokga;" so Pansori singers sing those parts earnestly.
Sugungga is based on the story of the Dragon King of the Southern Sea, a terrapin, and a wily rabbit. This story is believed to have stemmed from a tale about a terrapin and a rabbit in the early period of the Silla Dynasty. The theme of this story is the relationship of subject to king.

Recently, the play was popularized by the Korean band Leenalchi (Korean: 이날치) who uploaded their live action performance of the story on YouTube. The video went viral in Korea, amassing over 6 million views as of January 2021.

Plot
The story begins in a fictional kingdom in the Southern Sea ruled by a Dragon King. The King suffers from an illness that can only be cured by consuming the liver of a rabbit. In hopes of finding the liver to cure his disease, the dragon king commands his servants to go onto land, find a rabbit, and bring its liver back to the kingdom. Out of the servants, a terrapin volunteers to perform this act, showing his loyalty to the king.

The terrapin is met with several challenges on land from an encounter with a predatory tiger to not knowing what a rabbit looks like. At the end, however, the terrapin succeeds in finding a rabbit. In order to get the rabbit to follow it back to the underwater kingdom, the terrapin lures the rabbit by telling him that a wonderous and luxurious life awaits it there. The rabbit falls for it, follows the terrapin underwater, and soon finds itself captured in the dragon king's palace. The rabbit soon realizes that it had been tricked and will be soon slaughtered for its liver. Right before slaughtering, however, the rabbit tells the dragon king that its liver is so much in demand that someone may steal it away from the king as soon as he kills it and that because of this, it had to be slaughtered somewhere away from everyone. The dragon king listens to the rabbit and commands the terrapin to kill it away from the kingdom. Upon getting far enough from the kingdom, the rabbit ridicules the dragon king's naïveté and flees back onto land, essentially tricking both the terrapin and the dragon king.

The story ends with the rabbit ridiculing the king and the terrapin once again, but admiring the terrapin's loyalty to the king as well.

Theme
The primary, over-arching theme of the story is the consequences of being naïve. In the story, the dragon King learns the hard way that being naive is a negative trait by missing an opportunity to live. It can be reasonably implied that the King loses its life after the story because of his naïveté.

See also
Changgeuk
Korean music
Pansori
Pansori gosu
Culture of Korea

References
National Changguk Company of Korea

Pansori
Korean folklore